Nuclear valosin-containing protein-like is a protein that in humans is encoded by the NVL gene.

References

Further reading